How Do You Want Me? is a British television sitcom, produced by Kensington Films & Television, written by Simon Nye, and directed by John Henderson.

Plot
Dylan Moran starred as boy next door Ian Lyons, who recently eloped with country girl Lisa Yardley (Charlotte Coleman).  At the show's start, after a year living in London they move to the village of Snowle, where her intimidating father (Frank Finlay) breeds turkeys.  He and most of Lisa's family (which included Emma Chambers as her sister and Peter Serafinowicz as her thuggish brother) take a strong dislike to Ian, and much of the comedy comes from how Ian copes with life with her family and village life in general.  The situation is also complicated by Lisa's ex-boyfriend Derek (Mark Heap), who still loves her.

The series' title is a reference to the trade Ian takes up within the village, buying the business of the local photographer despite having no formal training in photography (he had previously managed a comedy club in London). Photography plays an important part within the stories; the beginning of series one shows Ian and Lisa outside a country church having wedding photos taken; this is then shown to be a staged event arranged by Lisa's family due to their unhappiness at them eloping and marrying abroad prior to the series starting. Ian first realises the extent of the family's hatred for him when he witnesses Lisa's mother cutting him out of the wedding pictures at the end of the first episode. Further episodes also have photography playing a key role, including an episode where nude photos of Lisa get circulated around the village after her brother and his friends discover them. Another episode sees Lisa's sister approach Ian for a photo shoot, and her disappointment when he is unable to photograph her looking glamorous and beautiful. There is a running joke throughout the series of Ian wanting to make a book of photographs of country fire stations in Britain.

Series 2 ends with Ian and Lisa sitting in their car debating whether to leave the village; Ian cannot bear to live there any more due to the repeated aggression shown by Lisa's family to him but Lisa does not want to live in London.

Cast
 Dylan Moran as Ian Lyons
 Charlotte Coleman as Lisa Lyons
 Frank Finlay as Astley Yardley, Lisa's father
 Diana Fairfax as Pam Yardley, Lisa's mother
 Emma Chambers as Helen Yardley, Lisa's sister
 Peter Serafinowicz as Dean Yardley, Lisa's brother
 Simon Bateson as Warren Yardley, Lisa's brother
 Mark Heap as Derek Few
 Clive Merrison as Norriswood
 Geraldine McNulty as Honor Deacon

Episodes
There were two series of How Do You Want Me?, broadcast in 1998 and 1999, each with six episodes.

Series 1
The first series was broadcast at 10pm on Tuesdays, from 24 February until 31 March 1998.

 No One Can Hear You Scream
 Floppy But Not Too Floppy
 Monstrous
 Woof!
 The Hidden World of Country Fire Stations
 Sausage, Balloon, Bum

Series 2
The second series was broadcast at 10pm on Wednesdays, from 10 November until 22 December 1999.

 White Pubic Hair
 I'm Not An Alcoholic
 Nude Modelling Module
 Bad Builders
 Ready Steady Kill
 The Pleasures of Village Life

Media releases
"How Do You Want Me?: The Complete Collection" was released on DVD in the UK on 3 July 2006.

In 2010, The Guardian ranked the serial at number 16 in their list of "The Top 50 TV Dramas of All Time".

References

External links

BBC television sitcoms
1990s British sitcoms
1998 British television series debuts
1999 British television series endings
English-language television shows
Television shows set in England